Félix Vidal Celis Zabala (born August 21, 1982 in Santander) is a Spanish cyclist.

Palmarès

2002
1s stage 9 Circuito Montañés
2003
1st stage 1 Vuelta a Cantabria
2004
1st stage 4 Bizkaiko Bira
1st stage 2 Vuelta a Cantabria
2006
1st stage 7 Circuito Montañés
2007
1st Vuelta a Segovia
1st stage 2 Vuelta a Zamora
2011
1st stages 2 and 5 Jelajah Malaysia

References

1982 births
Living people
Spanish male cyclists
Cyclists from Cantabria
Sportspeople from Santander, Spain